Harrison Neal (born 12 May 2001) is an English footballer who plays as a midfielder for Barrow on loan from Sheffield United.

Career
On 13 August 2021, Neal moved on loan for the first time in his career when he joined National League North club Kettering Town on loan. Neal made his senior debut the following day in a 1–0 victory over Bradford (Park Avenue). On 2 January 2022, in what proved to be his final match for the club, Neal scored his first senior goal with his side's third in a 3–1 victory over league leaders Brackley Town. The following day, Neal joined National League club Southend United on loan for the remainder of the 2021–22 season.

On 12 July 2022, Neal joined EFL League Two club Barrow on loan for the 2022–23 season.

Career statistics 

 As of 18 February 2023

References

External links

2001 births
Living people
English footballers
Association football midfielders
Sheffield United F.C. players
Kettering Town F.C. players
Southend United F.C. players
Barrow A.F.C. players
National League (English football) players
English Football League players